The 2016–17 Savannah State Tigers basketball team represented Savannah State University during the 2016–17 NCAA Division I men's basketball season. The Tigers, led by 12th-year head coach Horace Broadnax, played their home games at Tiger Arena and were members of the Mid-Eastern Athletic Conference. They finished the season 13–16, 10–6 in MEAC play to finish in fifth place. The team was ineligible for postseason play due to APR violations.

Previous season
They finished the 2015–16 season 16–16, 9–7 in MEAC play to finish in fifth place. They defeated Delaware State and Bethune–Cookman to advance to the semifinals of the MEAC tournament where they lost to Hampton. They were invited to the CollegeInsdier.com Tournament where they lost in the first round to Texas–Arlington.

Preseason 
The Eagles were picked to finish in 11th place in the preseason MEAC poll. Troyce Manassa was named to the preseason All-MEAC third team.

Roster

Schedule

|-
!colspan=9 style="background:#; color:white;"| Exhibition

|-
!colspan=9 style="background:#; color:white;"| Non-conference regular season

|-
!colspan=9 style="background:#; color:white;"| MEAC regular season

References

Savannah State Tigers basketball seasons
Savannah State
Savannah State Tigers basketball team
Savannah State Tigers basketball team